Julie Shiflet (born October 7, 1972) is an American former professional tennis player.

A native of Virginia Beach, Shiflet grew up in a tennis involved family, which owned the Virginia Beach Tennis and Country Club. She played collegiate tennis for William & Mary and was a singles All-American in 1992, as a freshman.

Shiflet, who reached a career high singles ranking of 212 in the world, featured in the qualifying draw for the 1990 US Open. Her best performance on the WTA Tour came at the 1991 Colorado Tennis Classic, where she had a first round win over Heather Ludloff, then took the eventual champion Lori McNeil to three sets in the round of 16.

ITF finals

Singles: 1 (1–0)

References

External links
 
 

1972 births
Living people
American female tennis players
William & Mary Tribe women's tennis players
Tennis people from Virginia
Sportspeople from Virginia Beach, Virginia